Barry Schwartz may refer to:

 Barry Schwartz (psychologist) (born 1946), American psychologist
 Barry Schwartz (technologist) (born 1980), blogger and reporter who writes about search engines and search engine marketing
 Barry K. Schwartz (born 1942), American businessman, Thoroughbred racehorse owner, and former horse racing industry executive
 Barry Schwartz (sociologist) (1938–2021), American sociologist